The 1934 United States Senate elections were held in the middle of Democratic President Franklin D. Roosevelt's first term. The 32 seats of Class 1 were contested in regular elections, and special elections were held to fill vacancies. During the Great Depression, voters strongly backed Roosevelt's New Deal and his allies in the Senate, with Democrats picking up a net of nine seats, giving them a supermajority (which required 64 seats, two-thirds of the total 96 seats in 1934). This marked the first time that an incumbent president's party did not lose seats in both houses in a midterm election, followed by 1998 and 2002. This was also the first time in American history that the opposition party failed to flip any Senate seats, something that only occurred once since, in 2022.

Gains, losses, and holds

Retirements
Three Democrats and one Republican retired instead of seeking re-election.

Defeats
Eight Republicans and two Democrats sought re-election but lost in the primary or general election.

Party Switches
One Republican won re-election as a Progressive.

Change in composition

Before the elections 
At the beginning of 1934.

Elections result

Race summaries

Elections during the 73rd Congress 
In these special elections, the winners were seated during 1934; ordered by election date then by state.

Elections leading to the 74th Congress 

In these general elections, the winners were elected for the term beginning January 3, 1935; ordered by state.

All of the elections involved the Class 1 seats.

Closest races 
Ten races had a margin of victory under 10%:

Virginia was the tipping point state with a margin of 55.1%.

Arizona

California

Connecticut

Delaware

Florida

Indiana

Maine

Maryland

Massachusetts

Michigan

Minnesota

Mississippi

Missouri

Montana

Montana (regular)

Montana (special)

Nebraska

Nebraska (regular)

Nebraska (special)

Nevada

New Jersey

New Mexico

New Mexico (regular)

New Mexico (special)

New York 

In New York, the whole Democratic ticket was elected in the third landslide in a row.

North Dakota

Ohio

Pennsylvania

Rhode Island

Tennessee 

There were two elections due to a resignation.

Tennessee (regular) 

Three-term Democrat Kenneth D. McKellar was easily re-elected.

Tennessee (special) 

One-term Democrat Cordell Hull resigned March 3, 1933 to become U.S. Secretary of State.

Democrat Nathan L. Bachman was appointed to continue Hull's term, pending a special election which Bachman easily won.

Texas

Utah

Vermont

Vermont (regular)

Vermont (special)

Virginia

Washington

West Virginia

Wisconsin

Wyoming 

There were two elections to the same seat due to the November 3, 1933 death of Democrat John B. Kendrick. Democrat Joseph C. O'Mahoney was appointed to continue the term, pending a special election.  O'Mahoney won both the special election and the regular election to the next term.

Wyoming (regular)

Wyoming (special) 

O'Mahoney would be re-elected twice and serve until his 1952 defeat.

See also
 1934 United States elections
 1934 United States House of Representatives elections
 73rd United States Congress
 74th United States Congress

Notes

References